The John Coltrane Home is a house in the Dix Hills neighborhood of Huntington, Suffolk County, New York, where saxophonist John Coltrane lived from 1964 until his death in 1967. It was in this home that he composed A Love Supreme.

Background
Coltrane and his wife moved their family to Long Island in 1964. The family included his wife, Alice Coltrane; her daughter, Michelle, from a previous marriage; and their three children, John Jr., Ravi, and Oran. He lived in this house until he died from liver cancer at Huntington Hospital on July 17, 1967, at the age of 40. Alice Coltrane lived in the house until 1973.

The basement of the house was the site of Coltrane Studios where many of his demo recordings were made. It is a 1950s era brick and wood frame "Farm Ranch" building with four bedrooms, living room, studio in the basement, and a practice room above the garage. The practice room is where the album A Love Supreme was composed.

Preservation efforts

In 2002, the  house and property faced demolition and development until Steve Fulgoni, a local historian, discovered its provenance. Fulgoni alerted owner Ash Agrawal, Coltrane's widow Alice, and the Huntington Historic Preservation Committee, who together sought a benefactor to buy the home in 2004.

In 2006 it was purchased by the Town of Huntington and given to the Friends of the Coltrane Home.

In 2007, the home was added to the New York State and the National Register of Historic Places. In 2011, the National Trust for Historic Preservation included the home on its list of the 11 Most Endangered Places.

In 2018, it received an award from the African American Cultural Heritage Action Fund.

See also

Louis Armstrong House and Archives
John Coltrane House (in Philadelphia)

References

External links

 The Coltrane Home in Dix Hills, New York
 Saving the Coltrane Home in Dix Hills
 
 "Saving the House of Jazz Legend John Coltrane" at the BBC

Houses in Suffolk County, New York
Houses on the National Register of Historic Places in New York (state)
Monuments to composers
National Register of Historic Places in Huntington (town), New York
Home